Geshn may refer to:
 Geshn, Razavi Khorasan